Lordelo may refer to:

Places in Portugal
Lordelo (Paredes), also known as São Salvador de Lordelo, a town in Paredes
 Aliados Lordelo F.C., football team in Lordelo (Paredes)
Lordelo do Ouro e Massarelos (formerly Lordelo do Ouro), a parish in Porto

People
Henrique Lordelo (born 2000), Portuguese footballer